George David Muir (born 24 February 1994) is a New Zealand field hockey player.

Personal life
George Muir was born and raised in North Harbour, New Zealand.

Muir works as a law clerk at Simpson Western in Auckland.

Career

Domestic competition
In the New Zealand National Hockey League, Muir plays for North Harbour.

National teams

Under-21
Muir appeared in the New Zealand U-21 side on two occasions; at the 2012 Sultan of Johor Cup and the 2013 FIH Junior World Cup.

Black Sticks
In 2013, Muir made his senior international debut for the Black Sticks during the 2012–13 FIH World League Semi-Finals in Rotterdam.

Muir's most prominent appearance with the national team was at the 2018 Commonwealth Games on the Gold Coast, where the team won a silver medal.

During the inaugural tournament of the FIH Pro League, Muir was a member of the New Zealand team that finished in 8th place.

References

External links
 
 
 
 
 

1994 births
Living people
New Zealand male field hockey players
Male field hockey midfielders
2018 Men's Hockey World Cup players
Commonwealth Games silver medallists for New Zealand
Commonwealth Games medallists in field hockey
Field hockey players at the 2018 Commonwealth Games
Field hockey players at the 2020 Summer Olympics
Olympic field hockey players of New Zealand
Medallists at the 2018 Commonwealth Games